The ESO 3.6 m Telescope is an optical reflecting telescope run by the European Southern Observatory at La Silla Observatory, Chile since 1977, with a clear aperture of about  and  area.

The telescopes uses the HARPS instrument and has discovered more than 130 exoplanets. In 2012, it discovered Alpha Centauri Bb, a now-disproven possible planet in the Alpha Centauri system only 4.4 light-years away.

ESO collaborated with CERN on building the telescope. It saw first light in 1976 and entered full operations in 1977. When completed it was one of the world's largest optical telescopes. It received an overhaul in 1999 and a new secondary in 2004. The ESO 3.6-metre Telescope has supported many scientific achievements and presented ADONIS, one of the first adaptive optics system available to the astronomical community in the 1980s.

Instruments 

Since April 2008, the only instrument on the ESO 3.6 m telescope is HARPS, the High Accuracy Radial Velocity Planet Searcher. HARPS is a fibre-fed high resolution echelle spectrograph dedicated to the discovery of extrasolar planets. Other instruments on the telescope, now decommissioned, include:
 CES: is a spectrograph that provides a resolving power of up to 235,000 in the 346–1028 nm region.
 EFOSC2: the ESO Faint Object Spectrograph and Camera (v.2), is a very versatile instrument for low resolution spectroscopy and imaging.
 TIMMI-2: the Thermal Infrared MultiMode Instrument dedicated to the 3–25 µm spectrum.
 ADONIS: is the acronym for Adaptive Optics Near Infrared System, and was a second-generation adaptive optics system for the astronomical community. More than 40 peer-reviewed scientific articles were  published based on this instrument data. ADONIS is the final version of diverse Adaptive Optics (AO) prototypes named Come-on and Come-on +. It was offered in its final version in October 1996 as an official ESO instrument, then decommissioned in 2001. ADONIS was the first AO system offered to a large community of astronomers.

Recent scientific achievements 

The ESO 3.6 m telescope has made several scientific discoveries since it saw first light. Recent astronomical achievements were made possible by HARPS, a "top-class" instrument. This include finding the lightest exoplanet known at the time of discovery in, Gliese 581e, with only twice the mass of the Earth, and the richest planetary system known at the time, with up to seven planets orbiting a Sun-like star.

The telescope was also involved in solving a decades-old mystery regarding the mass of Cepheid variable stars. By using the HARPS instrument, astronomers detected for the first time a double star where a pulsating Cepheid variable and another star pass in front of one another, which allows to measure the mass of the Cepheid. The study concluded that the mass prediction coming from the theory of stellar pulsation was correct while the value calculated was at odds with the theory of stellar evolution.

The discovery of the extrasolar planet Gliese 581 c by the team of Stéphane Udry at  University of Geneva's Observatory in Switzerland was announced on April 24, 2007. The team used the telescope's HARPS spectrograph, and employed the radial velocity technique to identify the planet's influence on the star.

By 2009, the telescope was used to discover 75 exoplanet candidates. In 2011, another 50 exoplanet candidates were announced.

Contemporaries on commissioning

Gallery

Telescope and site

Images from telescope

See also 
 List of largest optical reflecting telescopes
 List of largest optical telescopes in the 20th century

References

External links 

 ESO 3.6m homepage
 ESO homepage
 ADONIS ESO webpage

Optical telescopes
European Southern Observatory